The P112 is a single-board computer.

P112 may also refer to:
 , a patrol boat of the Mexican Navy
 Papyrus 112, a biblical manuscript
 , a patrol boat of the Turkish Navy
 P112, a state regional road in Latvia